The Empresa de Telecomunicaciones de Bogotá) is one of the principal telecommunication companies in Colombia, principally in Cundinamarca, Tolima and Villavicencio. In 2012 there were almost 2,000,000 telephone lines with this company.

Also, because ETB TV does not have coverage nationwide, they have an alliance with DirecTV Colombia in order to offer all services in the major cities of Colombia.

The company is the owner of the Alvaro Camargo de la Torre School and the Tomas Alva Edison School, providing education to employees' children.

History
ETB was created on August 28, 1884 when a Cuban, José Raimundo Martínez created the Colombian Telephone Company, or in Spanish, "La Compañia Colombiana de Telefonos (CTC)". The company's first headquarters was in the Arrubla Galleries, on the western side of the Plaza Bolívar, on 10th street and 8th avenue, Bogotá. In 1900, when they had 100 installed lines, a fire destroyed a good part of the Arrubla Galleries and taking with it the facilities and the main office of the Colombian Telephone Company. Six years later, they resumed provisional service by means of The Bogotá Telephone Company. The headquarters of the new company were located on 8th avenue and 20th street, where the principal offices of the company were located.

Although the concession offered for the exploitation of service to The Bogota Telephone Company was for 50 years, the continuous protests by the rate increases led the Council to decide that the municipality should acquire the Company. Thus, since 1932 the Administration of the city assumed control of the service of phone system and in 1940, by means of agreement 79 of the Council, the Telephone Company of Bogotá was created, a decentralized company and a hundred percent city-owned.

In 1961, the company entered into central operations with Usaquén, Bosa, Suba and Central Nariño. At the end of the 1970s, the company counted close to 400,000 users and since 1985 that figure has grown to 710,000. The 1990s, marked a time of great change for ETB. The name used for 52 years was modified. In 1992, the company became the Telecommunications Company of Bogotá to adapt with their social objective for diversifying their activities.

The implementation of the norms described by the Decree Law 1900 of 1990 and the Law of Public Utilities of 1994 opened the doors for competition that was consolidated in 1996 when other telecommunications companies appeared. In 1997, the Council authorized the conversion of ETB into an action-based company, having its majority partner in the Capital District of Bogotá. In the middle of 1998, the Council approved the sale of ETB's shares to an international strategic partner. Although this sale was not carried out, the process gave the company close to 1,000 shareholders among their employees, former employees and pensioners. Thus the company was converted by their shares into a mixed capital company.

On January 20, 2003 the Ministry of Communications awarded ETB, in conjunction with EPM, the license of PCS, which gave them the possibility of entering into the mobile phone market. The last step in ETB's transformation process occurred in May 2003 when the company carried out the process of stock democratization that permitted the attainment of resources for 245 billion and linked 61,313 Colombians as investors. In August 2003, ETB entered into negotiations for the centers of telephone contracts by the way of a commercial alliance with Publicar. In this way, the company ‘Contact Center of the Americas’ was created.

Expansion and competition

Coverage expansion 
In 1961 it began operating the plants of Usaquén, Bosa, Suba and Antonio Nariño, allowing to have 400,000 users by 1979 and 710,000 in 1985.

Change in name and demonopolization of the phone service 

The 1990s were very important for the ETB, because, among so many things, the name that the company had used for 52 years was changed, translating the name from the Bogota's Telephone Enterprise (Empresa de Telefonos de Bogotá) to Bogota's Telecommunications Enterprise (Empresa de Telecomunicaciones de Bogotá) in order to change the company name to one more advanced and competitive.

The law 1900 of 1990's decrees and the public service law of 1994 opened the doors to the competition that was consolidated in 1996 when other companies appeared that made the communications sector more competitive.

In 1997 the local council authorized the conversion of ETB into a mixed society action, and a year later the sale of ETB to an international strategic partner was approved, but that tender was declared dessert..

National service and the use of the Internet

ETB like a national company 
On January 20, 1998 ETB won a license to be a national enterprise, making that the company could spread its services to a national area. The December 16 of the same year ETB started to operate using a long-distance call, its clients could make calls from all Colombia and all the world in 2000.

The Internet appears 
The company started operation of the data network with its division "Data Mundo", like with its nodo of Internet.

Companies based in Bogotá
ETB
ETB
Government-owned companies of Colombia
Companies listed on the Colombia Stock Exchange
1884 establishments in Colombia
Colombian brands